James Armstead (September 8, 1919 – November 9, 2006) was an American baseball outfielder and pitcher in the Negro leagues. He played from 1938 to 1942 and 1946 to 1951, with various teams. He is also listed in some sources as Jimmie Armistead.

In January 1942, Armistead enlisted in the United States Army Air Force and served during World War II.

References

External links
 and Baseball-Reference Black Baseball Stats and  Seamheads 
Negro League Baseball Players Association page
NLB museum
Obituary

1919 births
2006 deaths
Baltimore Elite Giants players
Birmingham Black Barons players
Indianapolis ABCs (1938) players
Philadelphia Stars players
St. Louis Stars (1939) players
Baseball players from Alabama
Baseball outfielders
21st-century African-American people